Pamatolol is a beta adrenergic receptor antagonist.

References

Beta blockers
Carbamates
N-isopropyl-phenoxypropanolamines
Methyl esters